Glaucocharis forcipella is a moth in the family Crambidae. It was described by Wang and Sung in 1988. It is found in the Sichuan province of China.

References

Diptychophorini
Moths described in 1988